is a Japanese actress best known for her roles in the sukeban (delinquent girl) subgenre of Toei's action/erotic form of "pink film" known as Pinky Violence'
'.

Life and career
Sugimoto began her career as a model and television personality. She made her film debut in Hot Springs Mimizu Geisha (1971), which starred Reiko Ike. Sugimoto's and Ike's careers would become closely linked in several of Toei's Pinky Violent films, in which they were usually cast as rivals. In 1973, Sugimoto won one of the Newcomer of the Year Awards at the Élan d'or Awards given by the All Nippon Producers Association (ANPA).

Sugimoto's best-known solo role was in Zero Woman: Red Handcuffs, the "over-the-top" crime film from (1974). When Toei expanded into the European market in the 1970s, Sugimoto's 1973 film Girl Boss: Escape From Reform School was released by Telemondial in France as Girl Boss – Les etudiantes en caval''. In 1978 she abandoned her film career for marriage, and later became a nursery school teacher.

Selected filmography
  (3 July 1971)
  (27 October 1971)
  (19 November 1971)
  (3 February 1972)
  (26 April 1972)
  (3 July 1972)
  (12 August 1972)
  (29 September 1972)
  (2 December 1972)
  (13 January 1973)
  (10 February 1973)
  (31 March 1973)
  (24 May 1973)
  (27 October 1973)
  (21 May 1974)
  (8 November 1975)
  (TV series) (1975)
  (28 February 1976)

Notes

Sources
 
 
 
 

1953 births
Japanese actresses
Japanese television personalities
Pink film actors
Living people